Amelia Helen Womack (born 12 January 1985) is a British Green Party of England and Wales politician. She served as the party's Deputy Leader from 2014 to 2022. She is a co-chair of the People's Assembly Against Austerity and co-founded Another Europe Is Possible.

She served as Deputy Leader of the Green Party of England and Wales alongside Shahrar Ali from 2014 to 2016. She was re-elected in September 2016, once again in September 2018 and then again in September 2020. Womack stood as her party's lead candidate in the South Wales East region in the 2021 Senedd election; she was not elected. Womack also stood on a joint ticket with Tamsin Omond in the 2021 Green Party leadership election, in which they finished in second place of five candidates vying for the party's leadership.

Education
Womack was born in Newport in Monmouthshire, Wales. She attended Bassaleg School, a state comprehensive school in the suburb of Bassaleg, from 1996 to 2003. She studied a BSc in Environmental Biology at Liverpool University, and went on to complete an MSc in environmental technology at Imperial College London in 2009, with a thesis entitled Who's afraid of environmental law? How the law of Ecocide can secure our environment for business resilience.

Political career
Womack joined the Green Party around 2000. She stood as a Green candidate for Herne Hill ward on Lambeth Council, in the 2014 United Kingdom local elections, and for London in the 2014 European Parliament election, though she won neither seat.

She was elected deputy leader of the Green Party in September 2014, delivering her first speech in the role at the party's conference on 6 September. Having been elected at the age of 29, Womack is the youngest deputy leader of any political party in the UK.

She stood in the Camberwell and Peckham constituency in the 2015 general election, finishing third with just over 10% of the vote.

In September 2015, Womack announced her intention to stand for the Wales Green Party in the 2016 National Assembly for Wales election. 
The Welsh Green Party announced in late October that she had been selected as the lead candidate for the regional South Wales Central (proportional representation) list as well as for the Cardiff Central constituency.

Womack's re-election as Deputy Leader of the Green Party of England and Wales was announced at the party conference in early September 2016. She served a second two-year term.

Through her work as an End Ecocide Campaigner, she has worked with Vivienne Westwood to promote the change in environmental law and attempt to secure the one million votes required for a European Citizens' Initiative.

In August 2016, she criticised Byron Hamburgers after they worked with the Home Office to call their London workers to a fake Health and Safety briefing, whereat immigration officials present at the venue arrested several employees, deporting 35 for immigration offences. Womack was quoted as saying "It’s about the family and friends of people who are left behind as well. You don’t need to be pro-migration to realise that employing people, having them pay tax and contribute to the company for years and then turn them over to authorities without any responsibility for the chaos caused is the wrong thing to do".

In March 2017, Womack reported the Daily Mail newspaper to the Independent Press Standards Organisation over a front page photo of Theresa May and Nicola Sturgeon with the caption "Never mind Brexit, who won Legs-it". In her submission she said: "This headline and the further derogatory comments inside the paper would not have even been considered, let alone published, if the two politicians in question had been men".

Womack was again re-elected Deputy Leader of the Green Party of England and Wales in September 2018. She is currently serving a two-year term.

In January 2019 she apologised for tweeting a picture accused of being antisemitic.

In February 2019, it was announced that Womack would be the Wales Green Party candidate in the 2019 Newport West by-election, a position she had nominally been selected for in November 2018. The by-election was held on 4 April 2019 and Womack finished in sixth place in a field of 11 candidates, with 924 votes (3.9% of the total votes cast).

In August 2019, Womack was again nominated by the Wales Green Party as the candidate for Newport West in a prospective snap general election.  Womack stood in the 2019 general election. She again came in sixth place, but this time out of a field of six candidates. She achieved a smaller share of the vote compared to the by-election, receiving 2.1% of the total votes cast.

In June 2020, Womack announced her intention to stand again as deputy leader. On 9 September 2020, it was announced that she had been re-elected by party members for a fourth term.

Womack stood as her party's lead candidate in the South Wales East region in the 2021 Senedd election.

In August 2021, Womack announced her candidacy on a joint ticket with Tamsin Omond for the 2021 Green Party of England and Wales leadership election. Their joint leadership ticket lost the leadership election to the joint ticket of Adrian Ramsay and Carla Denyer, coming in second place out of five candidates.

In March 2022, Womack announced that she would not be standing in the 2022 Green Party of England and Wales deputy leadership election.

Electoral history

2021 Senedd election

2019 general election

2019 by-election

2016 Welsh Assembly election

2015 general election

2014 European elections

2014 Lambeth London Borough Council election

See also
 2014 Green Party of England and Wales leadership election
 2016 Green Party of England and Wales leadership election
2018 Green Party of England and Wales leadership election

References

External links
Profile page on the Green Party of England and Wales official website

1985 births
Living people
Green Party of England and Wales parliamentary candidates
Alumni of Imperial College London
Alumni of the University of Liverpool
British abortion-rights activists
British environmentalists
People educated at Bassaleg School
People from Newport, Wales